The Chamber of Deputies is the lower house of the bicameral Italian Parliament (the other being the Senate of the Republic). The two houses together form a perfect bicameral system, meaning they perform identical functions, but do so separately. The Chamber of Deputies has 400 seats, of which 392 will be elected from Italian constituencies, and 8 from Italian citizens living abroad. Deputies are styled The Honourable (Italian: Onorevole) and meet at Palazzo Montecitorio.

Location

The seat of the Chamber of Deputies is the Palazzo Montecitorio, where it has met since 1871, shortly after the capital of the Kingdom of Italy was moved to Rome at the successful conclusion of the Italian unification Risorgimento movement.

Previously, the seat of the Chamber of Deputies of the Kingdom of Italy had been briefly at the Palazzo Carignano in Turin (1861–1865) and the Palazzo Vecchio in Florence (1865–1871). Under the Fascist regime of Benito Mussolini, the Chamber of Deputies was abolished and replaced by the figurehead Chamber of Fasces and Corporations from 1939 to 1943 (during World War II).

Normal operation
The Chamber is composed of all members meeting in session at the Montecitorio. The assembly also has the right to attend meetings of the Government and its ministers. If required, the Government is obligated to attend the session. Conversely, the Government has the right to be heard every time it requires.

The term of office of the House (as well as the Senate) is five years, but can be extended in two cases:
The "prorogatio", as provided by art. 61.2 of the Constitution, states that deputies whose terms have expired shall continue to exercise their functions until the first meeting of the new Chamber.
An extension of the term, provided for by art. 60.2, can be enacted only in case of war.

Electoral system

The electoral system is a mixed-member majoritarian with 37% of seats allocated using first-past-the-post voting (FPTP) and 63% using proportional representation, allocated with the largest remainder method, with one round of voting.

The 400 deputies are elected in:
 147 in single-member constituencies, by plurality;
 245 in multi-member constituencies, by national proportional representation;
 8 in multi-member abroad constituencies, by constituency proportional representation.

For Italian residents, each house members are elected by single ballots, including the constituency candidate and his supporting party lists. In each single-member constituency the deputy/senator is elected on a plurality basis, while the seats in multi-member constituencies will be allocated nationally. In order to be calculated in single-member constituency results, parties need to obtain at least 1% of the national vote. In order to receive seats in multi-member constituencies, parties need to obtain at least 3% of the national vote. Elects from multi-member constituencies will come from closed lists.

The single voting paper, containing both first-past-the-post candidates and the party lists, shows the names of the candidates to single-member constituencies and, in close conjunction with them, the symbols of the linked lists for the proportional part, each one with a list of the relative candidates.

The voter can cast his vote in three different ways:

 Drawing a sign on the symbol of a list: in this case the vote extends to the candidate in the single-member constituency which is supported by that list.
 Drawing a sign on the name of the candidate of the single-member constituency and another one on the symbol of one list that supports them: the result is the same as that described above; it is not allowed, under penalty of annulment, the panachage, so the voter can not vote simultaneously for a candidate in the FPTP constituency and for a list which is not linked to them.
 Drawing a sign only on the name of the candidate for the FPTP constituency, without indicating any list: in this case, the vote is valid for the candidate in the single-member constituency and also automatically extended to the list that supports them; if that candidate is however connected to several lists, the vote is divided proportionally between them, based on the votes that each one has obtained in that constituency.

Article 61 of the Italian Constitution maintains that elections for the Chamber of Deputies must take place within 70 days of the dissolution of the house, and that representatives must convene within 20 days of those elections.

President

The President of the Chamber of Deputies (Presidente della Camera dei Deputati) performs the role of speaker of the house and is elected during the first session after the election. During this time the prerogatives of speaker are assumed by the vice president of Chamber of Deputies of the previous legislature who was elected first. If two were elected simultaneously, the oldest deputy serves as president of Chamber of Deputies.

The President of Chamber of Deputies has also the role of President during the Parliament joint sessions, when the upper and lower houses have to vote together.

Lorenzo Fontana is the current president of the Chamber of Deputies.

Membership 

The Chamber has 400 members. They were most recently elected at the 2022 general election.

Reform proposals 
In 2019, the Italian parliament passed a constitutional law that reduces the number of the deputies from 630 to 400. The law was approved on 21 and 22 September 2020 by a referendum.

Legislature XIX of Italy was the first one in which the number of Deputies was equal to 400.

Historical composition

1861–1924

Since 1945

Predecessors
Chamber of Deputies (Kingdom of Sardinia) — 4 March 1848 to 17 March 1861
Chamber of Deputies (Kingdom of Italy) — 17 March 1861 to 23 March 1939
Chamber of Fasces and Corporations — 23 March 1939 to 2 August 1943
National Council (Italy) — 25 September 1945 to 2 June 1946 
Constituent Assembly of Italy — 2 June 1946 to 31 January 1948

See also
Bicameralism
Chamber of Deputies
Italian Parliament
Italian Senate
Camera dei Deputati (TV channel)

Notes

References

External links
 

1871 establishments in Italy
Italy, Chamber of Deputies
Chamber of Deputies